The men's 400 metres at the 1988 Summer Olympics in Seoul, South Korea took place between 24 and 28 September 1988. Seventy-five athletes from 55 nations competed. The maximum number of athletes per nation had been set at 3 since the 1930 Olympic Congress. The event was won by Steve Lewis of the United States, the second in what would ultimately be 7 consecutive American victories stretching from 1984 to 2008. The United States swept the podium in the event for the third time, having previously done so in 1904 and 1968.

Summary

It always promised to be a classic. The clear favourite was the legendary American Harry "Butch" Reynolds. He had set a new world record of 43.29 seconds only a few months before. Reynolds breezed through the heats and into the final.

The final, ran on Thursday September 28, 1988, started somewhat as expected, with Reynolds holding back and saving himself for his normal strong finish. To the surprise of most watching a young American Steve Lewis went out strong from the start and gave Reynolds a run for his money. Entering the home straight Lewis was leading and Reynolds charging back at him but Reynolds left it too late and the 19yr old Lewis hung on for victory in an amazing time of 43.87sec. Reynolds finished second and Danny Everett third for an American sweep. The same trio was also involved with Kevin Robinzine in winning the 4 × 400 m relay.

The career of Lewis was blighted by injury although he did compete in the 1992 Summer Olympics in Barcelona, Spain, placing 2nd in 400m and being part of the American quartet who took gold in 4 × 400 m relay.

Background

This was the 21st appearance of the event, which is one of 12 athletics events to have been held at every Summer Olympics. None of the Americans from 1984 returned, but all five non-American finalists did: silver medalist Gabriel Tiacoh of the Ivory Coast, fourth-place finisher Darren Clark of Australia, sixth-place finisher Sunday Uti and seventh-place finisher Innocent Egbunike of Nigeria, and Bert Cameron of Jamaica (who had qualified for but did not start the Los Angeles final due to injury). The new American team was favored, however; Butch Reynolds had just broken the 20-year-old world record, and Danny Everett and Steve Lewis were strong contenders. The 1987 world champion, Thomas Schönlebe of East Germany, was also a significant challenger.

Bangladesh, Honduras, Indonesia, the Maldives, Mali, Saint Vincent and the Grenadines, South Korea, Vanuatu, the (U.S.) Virgin Islands, and Zaire appeared in this event for the first time; the Republic of China had previously competed, but now appeared as Chinese Taipei for the first time. The United States made its 20th appearance, most of any nation, having missed only the boycotted 1980 Games.

Competition format

The competition retained the basic four-round format from 1920. The "fastest loser" system, introduced in 1964, was used for the first round. There were 10 first-round heats, each with 7 or 8 runners. The top three runners in each heat advanced, along with the next two fastest overall. The 32 quarterfinalists were divided into 4 quarterfinals with 8 runners each; the top four athletes in each quarterfinal heat advanced to the semifinals, with no "fastest loser" spots. The semifinals featured 2 heats of 8 runners each. The top four runners in each semifinal heat advanced, making an eight-man final.

Records

These were the standing world and Olympic records (in seconds) prior to the 1976 Summer Olympics.

No world or Olympic records were set during this event.

Schedule

Following the 1984 schedule, the event was held on four separate days, with each round being on a different day. 

All times are Korea Standard Time adjusted for daylight savings (UTC+10)

Results

Round 1

Heat 1

Heat 2

Heat 3

Heat 4

Heat 5

Heat 6

Heat 7

Heat 8

Heat 9

Heat 10

Quarterfinals

Quarterfinal 1

Quarterfinal 2

Quarterfinal 3

Quarterfinal 4

Semifinals

Semifinal 1

Semifinal 2

Final

Lewis' winning margin of 0.06 seconds remains the smallest winning margin in the history of the event.

See also
 1987 Men's World Championships 400 metres (Rome)
 1990 Men's European Championships 400 metres (Split)
 1991 Men's World Championships 400 metres (Tokyo)
 1992 Men's Olympic 400 metres (Barcelona)

References

External links
  Official Report

4
400 metres at the Olympics
Men's events at the 1988 Summer Olympics